Petrel Island may refer to:

Petral Group in Australia
 Big Sandy Petrel Island
 Big Stony Petrel Island
 Little Stony Petrel Island
 South West Petrel Island
 Kangaroo Island (Tasmania)
 Howie Island

Other places
 Petrel Island (Antarctica)
 Bajo Nuevo Bank, also known as the Petrel Islands, Colombia
 Petrel Island (South Georgia), United States